Holiday in Seoul is a 1997 South Korean film starring Choi Jin-sil. The film is two stories of how four people intertwine in Seoul's urban jungle.

External links 
 

1997 films
1990s Korean-language films
South Korean drama films